The Montreal Tundra/Toundra de Montréal are a Canadian professional basketball team based in Montreal, Quebec. Founded in 2022, the team competes in The Basketball League (TBL) and play their home games at the Centre Pierre Charbonneau. It played its first game on March 4, 2023, a 121-117 win over the Virginia Valley Vipers.

Background
Prior to 2021, the most recent professional basketball team in Montreal was in 2012 when the National Basketball League of Canada (NBLC) added the Montreal Jazz as an expansion team. The team did not play in the 2013–14 NBL Canada season after failing to secure a new ownership group. Since 2021, the city of Montreal has also been home to the Montreal Alliance of the Canadian Elite Basketball League.

Formation 
On June 18, 2022, the NBLC announced that TBL President David Magley, a former NBL Commissioner, will work alongside Audley Stephenson, the current NBLC Commissioner, in overseeing the growth of both leagues.

The league announced that Montreal was approved as a basketball franchise for the upcoming 2023 season. On October 5, 2022,  a group of local investors fronted by Canadian basketball player Juan Mendez announced that they had launched a new, Montreal-based professional team that will play in TBL. As a result, of the previous additions of the Newfoundland Rogues and L'Academie D'Alma, the TBL will have three Canadian teams for the 2023 season.

On December 8, 2022, the team name was revealed as the Montreal Tundra/Toundra de Montréal and Igor Rwigema announced as its head coach.

References

The Basketball League teams
Basketball teams established in 2022
2022 establishments in Quebec
Basketball teams in Montreal